Vantage Hills is a small, escarpment-like hills located 5 nautical miles (9 km) west of the south end of Gair Mesa. The hills overlook the saddle of the Campbell Glacier with Rennick Glacier from the south, in Victoria Land. So named by the northern party of New Zealand Geological Survey Antarctic Expedition (NZGSAE), 1962–63, for their position of "vantage."

Hills of Victoria Land
Pennell Coast